Double-A (pronounced "Double-A"), stylized as "AA", was a South Korean boy band formed by Wellmade Yedang, formerly known as Well Made STAR M in 2011. The group consists of two members: Woosang and Hoik. Since 2015, Blue Star was acquired by Wellmade Yedang, the group while managed by Blue Star.

Career 
Aoora was the first to join the group. Looking for a company he could work with and make music he decided on Well Made STAR M. Aoora then brought Woosang to the group, asking him to do the choreography for his music. The company then later added Juwon and Hoik, who had aspirations to be singers and moved from Busan to Seoul to do so, and Kimchi, who had quit learning the piano and clarinet to his dream of becoming a singer.

The song "So Crazy" and its music video earned them much critical acclaim, with their debut marked as "sexy and charismatic". Despite Aoora being the oldest, Woosang became leader. On 4 November 2011 Double A performed their debut stage live on KBS's Music Bank. The group also performed "So Crazy" on various music shows in South Korea such as MBC's Music Core, JTBC's Music On Top and SBS's Inkigayo.

On 7 March 2013, AA pre-released a song from their upcoming mini album, Rollin Rollin. The song was banned and deemed unfit for broadcast by KBS and SBS. 27 March marked the end of AA's year and six-month hiatus with the release of their first mini album, Come Back. The six tracks that were included within the album were all composed, arranged and produced by Aoora.

On 17 June 2013, AA's label revealed, "Joowon has decided to leave the group in order to fulfill his dreams as an actor. He's always had a strong passion for acting. He gave it a lot of thought and talked it over with the members' to come to the decision. Even after he leaves, he'll be staying at the label Wellmade StarM and support the AA members." AA will have an addition of two new members in place of Joowon.

On 30 May 2015, the youngest member Jinhong was revealed to be the newest member added to the boy band 24K. Later on, was discovered that the member Kimchi left the group in the process of switching companies to Wellmade Star M's subsidiary BLUE STAR Entertainment, only remaining Aoora, Hoik and Woosang. Woosang was said that he will join the group promotions when he came back.

On 20 August 2015, was revealed a cover of Omi's "Cheerleader" by AOORA&HOIK. On 29 September 2015, was revealed the first episode of the third season of F@LLOW ME, starring only AOORA&HOIK, which confirmed that it's the sub-unit of the group.

On 1 October 2015, the sub-unit AOORA&HOIK revealed the single and MV for "아침 점심 저녁 (Morning, Afternoon, Evening)".

In May 2016, it was confirmed that Aoora's contract had expired with the agency in March.

Members 

 Hwang Ju-won (주원)
 Jinhong (김진홍)
 Kimchi (김치)
 Aoora (아우라)
 Woosang (우상)
 Hoik (J호익)

Timeline

Discography

Extended plays

Singles

References 

South Korean boy bands
K-pop music groups
Musical groups disestablished in 2014